Henry George Glyde  (June 18, 1906 – March 31, 1998) was a Canadian painter, draftsperson and art educator.

Teaching career
Born in Luton, England, Glyde attended the Royal College of Art in London, England (1926–1930) was a student instructor at the school (1929-1930), then was an art instructor at other schools. He came to Canada in 1935 to teach drawing in Calgary at the Provincial Institute of Technology and Art and in 1936 became head of the art department. He was also head of the painting division of the Banff School of Fine Arts (1937–1966). In 1937, he began teaching community art classes with the Department of Extension, University of Alberta, where he went on to establish the Department of Fine Art. He taught there between 1946 and 1966.

Art career
Glyde was known as a master draftsperson. His oils and murals might be called social realism. His murals are classical in mood and content. The emphasis on structure is evident in his interpretation of the Alberta landscape and the British Columbia coast. His painting Imperial Wildcat No. 3, Excelsior Field, near Edmonton appeared on a $1 stamp in a set of issued by Canada in 1967 to coincide with that year's celebration of the nation's Centennial. A major retrospective exhibition was produced by the Glenbow Museum in 1987. He was a member of the Canadian Society of Graphic Art, the Alberta Society of Artists (president in 1945), the Federation of Canadian Artists, and was made a full member of the Royal Canadian Academy of Arts in 1949.

He died on March 31, 1998 in Victoria, British Columbia, Canada.

Notes

External links
Henry George Glyde listed in the Art History Archive, retrieved on May 25, 2007.

20th-century Canadian painters
Canadian male painters
Academic staff of the University of Alberta
Canadian art educators
English emigrants to Canada
1906 births
1998 deaths
Members of the Royal Canadian Academy of Arts
20th-century Canadian male artists